Kano is a 2014 Taiwanese baseball period film directed by Umin Boya and produced by Jimmy Huang and Wei Te-sheng, based on a true story depicting the multiracial Kano baseball team from Japanese-era Taiwan, overcoming extreme odds to represent the island in the 1931 Japanese High School Baseball Championship at Koshien Stadium (located in Nishinomiya, Hyōgo Prefecture). Performing beyond all expectations, the underdog team advanced to the championship game in the tournament.

The film stars Masatoshi Nagase as Hyotaro Kondo, who coaches an underdog multi-ethnic high school team  comprising Taiwanese aborigines, Han Taiwanese and Japanese players. The team's star pitcher, Meisho "Akira" Go, is played by Yu-Ning Tsao, who won a Best Supporting Actor award at the 2014 Taipei Film Festival for his performance in the film.

The film also won Audience Awards from the Golden Horse Film Festival (where it also won a FIPRESCI Prize), the Taipei Film Festival and the Osaka Asian Film Festival. Kano is also the 6th highest grossing domestic Taiwanese film of all time.

Music

Theme song
Taiwan version (Japanese + Mandarin): 勇者的浪漫～風になって～/勇者的浪漫 Brave Romance
Composer: Rake / Lyrics: Rake, Yan Yunnong
Singer: Van Fan/Fan Yi-chen, Kousuke Atari, Luo Meiling, Suming Rupi/Shū Mǐ Ēn, Rake

HK version: 勇者的浪漫 Brave Romance (Cantonese)
Composer: Rake / Lyrics: 林若寧 / Supervisor: Schumann@Zoo Music / Arrange: Schumann@Zoo Music
Singer: Jason Chan/Chan Pak Yu, VnP

Taiwan version (Chinese): 勇者的浪漫(中文版) Brave Romance (Chinese)
Composer: Rake / Lyrics: Rake, Yan Yunnong
Singer: Luo Meiling (Irene Luo), Umin Boya, Wei Te-sheng, KANO staff (Yan Yunnong, Xie Jun Jie, Xie Jun-Cheng, Zhong Yan-Cheng, Zhang Hong Yi, Chen Jing-Hung, Zhou Jun Hao, Zheng Bing Hong, Sun Ruei, Ye Xing Chen)
Director: Li Su Qing

Japan version (Japanese + English): 風になって～勇者的浪漫～ /　Rake feat.中孝介 Brave Romance
Composer: Rake / Lyrics: Rake
Singer: Rake, Kousuke Atari

Accolades

Adaptations
A 3-volume comic series and a novel based on the movie were published by Yuan-Liou Publishing Co., Ltd.

References

External links
 
 

2014 films
2010s sports films
Baseball films
Films set in Taiwan
Films shot in Taiwan
Taiwanese sports films
Films set in Japan
Sports films based on actual events
Films set in 1931
2010s Japanese-language films